Clayton Michel Afonso (born 18 July 1988 in Brazil), commonly known simply as Clayton, is a former Brazilian-born Hong Kong professional football player who currently plays for Spartan South Midlands Football League club St. Panteleimon.

Club career
On 31 May 2022, Clayton left Eastern after finishing his contract with the club.

International career
Having stayed in Hong Kong for more than seven years, Clayton received his Hong Kong passport in 2017, making him eligible to represent the national team.

On 17 May 2021, Clayton was named within the 25-man squad by Mixu Paatelainen for the AFC World Cup qualifiers against Iran, Iraq and Bahrain.

On 15 June 2021, Clayton made his international debut for Hong Kong in the match against Bahrain in the AFC World Cup Qualifiers.

Career statistics

International

Honours

Club
Eastern
 Hong Kong Senior Shield: 2019–20
 Hong Kong FA Cup: 2019–20

Tai Po
 Hong Kong FA Cup: 2012–13

External links

 
 Clayton Michel Afonso at HKFA
 

1988 births
Living people
Brazilian footballers
Hong Kong footballers
Hong Kong international footballers
Association football defenders
Naturalized footballers of Hong Kong
Brazilian expatriate footballers
Expatriate footballers in Hong Kong
Expatriate footballers in England
Hong Kong expatriate footballers
Brazilian expatriate sportspeople in Hong Kong
Hong Kong First Division League players
Hong Kong Premier League players
Eastern Sports Club footballers
Tai Po FC players
Hong Kong Rangers FC players
Footballers from Brasília